The 1900 season in Swedish football, starting January 1900 and ending December 1900:

Events 
 1900-07-29 – AIK wins their first Swedish Championship ever, and the first of the new century.

Honours

Official titles

Competitions

Domestic results

Svenska Mästerskapet 1900 
Final

Rosenska Pokalen 1900 

Final

References 
Print

Online

 
Seasons in Swedish football